Gouri Dharmapal (1931—2014) was an Indian poet, Sanskrit scholar, and the former head of the department of Sanskrit at Lady Brabourne College at the University of Calcutta. In 2010 she was awarded a Certificate of Honour by the President of India. Dharmapal was the first woman priest of West Bengal.

Career
She graduated from Kolkata's renowned Scottish Church College in 1951.  and was subsequently awarded an Ishan Scholarship by the University of Calcutta for postgraduate studies. She conducted research at the SOAS, University of London, and at the British Museum in London. She has been a novelist, essayist, Indologist, as well as a storyteller for children's books.

References

Indian women poets
Bengali female poets
Indian Sanskrit scholars
People from West Bengal
Scottish Church College alumni
University of Calcutta alumni
Academic staff of the University of Calcutta
20th-century Indian poets

Educators from West Bengal
20th-century Indian women writers
1931 births
2014 deaths